Daliu is a town of Yuanhui District, in the southwestern suburbs of Luohe, Henan, People's Republic of China, located about  from downtown Luohe. , it has 23 villages under its administration.

See also 
 List of township-level divisions of Henan

References 

Township-level divisions of Henan
Luohe